The following is a list of Sites of Special Scientific Interest in the Wigtown and Stewartry Area of Search. For other areas, see List of SSSIs by Area of Search.

 Abbey Burn Foot to Balcary Point
 Airds of Kells Wood
 Ardwall Hill
 Auchencairn and Orchardton Bays
 Auchrochar Wetlands
 Back Bay to Carghidown
 Bailliewhirr
 Blood Moss
 Borgue Coast
 Burrow Head
 Cairnbaber
 Cairnsmore of Fleet
 Carrick Ponds
 Carsegowan Moss
 Carstramon Wood
 Clatteringshaws Dam Quarry
 Cleugh
 Corsewall Point - Milleur Point
 Cotland Plantation
 Cree Estuary
 Cruggleton Bay
 Derskelpin Moss
 Dowalton Loch
 Ellergower Moss
 Flow of Dergoals
 Glen App and Galloway Moors
 Glentrool Oakwoods
 Grennan Bay
 Hannaston Wood
 Heart Moss
 Isle of Whithorn Bay
 Kenmure Holms
 Kilhern Moss
 Killiegowan Wood
 Kirkcowan Flow
 Lagganmullan
 Laughenghie and Airie Hills
 Lea Larks
 Loch Doon
 Lower River Cree
 Merrick Kells
 Milton Loch
 Mochrum Lochs
 Morroch Bay
 Mull of Galloway
 Newlaw Moss
 Pibble Mine  De-notified (confirmed) on 17 November 2011
 Port Logan
 Port O'Warren
 Ravenshall Wood
 Ring Moss
 River Dee (Parton to Crossmichael)
 Salt Pans Bay
 Scare Rocks
 Shoulder O'Craig
 Skyreburn Grasslands
 Talnotry Mine
 Threave and Carlingwark Loch
 Torrs Moss
 Torrs to Mason's Walk
 Torrs Warren - Luce Sands
 Upper Solway Flats and Marshes
 Water of Ken Woods
 West Burrow Head
 White Loch - Lochinch
 Wood of Cree
 Woodhall Loch

 
Wigtown and Stewartry